Hăghig is a commune in Covasna County, Transylvania, Romania composed of two villages:
Hăghig
Iarăș / Nyáraspatak

Demographics

The commune has an ethnically mixed population. According to the 2011 census, it has a population of 2,258 of which 41.18% or 930 are Romanians, 30.55% or 690 are Roma and 28.12% or 635 are Székely Hungarians.

References

Communes in Covasna County
Localities in Transylvania